In enzymology, a proline 3-hydroxylase is an enzyme that catalyzes the chemical reaction

L-proline + 2-oxoglutarate + O2  cis-3-hydroxy-L-proline + succinate + CO2

The 3 substrates of this enzyme are L-proline, 2-oxoglutarate, and O2, whereas its 3 products are cis-3-hydroxy-L-proline, succinate, and CO2.

This enzyme belongs to the family of oxidoreductases, specifically those acting on paired donors, with O2 as oxidant and incorporation or reduction of oxygen. The oxygen incorporated need not be derived from O2 with 2-oxoglutarate as one donor, and incorporation of one atom o oxygen into each donor.  The systematic name of this enzyme class is L-proline,2-oxoglutarate:oxygen oxidoreductase (3-hydroxylating). This enzyme is also called P-3-H.

References

 
 
 

EC 1.14.11
Enzymes of unknown structure